Buxeta is a genus of moths of the family Yponomeutidae.

Species
Buxeta conflagrans - Walker, 1864 

Yponomeutidae